The 1963 Women's European Volleyball Championship was the sixth edition of the event, organised by Europe's governing volleyball body, the Confédération Européenne de Volleyball. It was hosted in several cities in Romania from 22 October to 2 November 1963, with the final round held in Constanţa.

Participating teams

Format
The tournament was played in two different stages. In the first stage, the thirteen participants were divided into four groups (three groups of three teams and one group of four teams). In the second stage, two groups were formed, one containing the winners and runners-up from all first stage groups (eight teams in total) to contest the tournament title. A second group was formed by the remaining five teams which played for position places (9th to 13th). All groups in both stages played a single round-robin format.

Pools composition

Squads

Venues

Preliminary round

Pool A
venue location: Bucharest, Romania

|}

|}

Pool B
venue location: Craiova, Romania

|}

|}

Pool C
venue location: Constanța, Romania

|}

|}

Pool D
venue location: Constanța, Romania

|}

|}

Final round

9th–13th pool
venue location: Brașov, Romania

|}

|}

Final pool
venue location: Constanța, Romania

|}

|}

Final ranking

References
 Confédération Européenne de Volleyball (CEV)

External links
 Results at todor66.com

European Volleyball Championships
Volleyball Championship
V
Women's European Volleyball Championships
Women's European Volleyball Championship
Women's European Volleyball Championship
Sport in Constanța
Women's volleyball in Romania